Curtis Walter Sandig (July 12, 1918 – February 13, 2006) was an American football halfback.

Sandig was born in Mart, Texas, in 1918 and attended Mart High School in that city. He played college football for Baylor and St. Mary's (TX). 

Sandig was selected by the Pittsburgh Steelers in the fifth round (31st overall pick) of the 1942 NFL Draft. He played for the Steelers in 1942, appearing in 11 games, eight of them as a starter. He tallied 116 rushing yards, 103 receiving yards, 373 punt and kick return yards, four touchdowns, and five interceptions for the 1943 Steelers.

Sandig served in the Navy during World War II, missing the 1943, 1944, and 1945 seasons.

After the war, he played in the All-America Football Conference for the Buffalo Bisons in 1946.  He appeared in nine games, one as a starter, for Buffalo.

Sandig died in 2006 at San Antonio.

References

1918 births
2006 deaths
American football halfbacks
Pittsburgh Steelers players
Buffalo Bisons (AAFC) players
Baylor Bears football players
St. Mary's Rattlers football players
Players of American football from San Antonio